Cryptandra apetala is a species of flowering plant in the family Rhamnaceae and is endemic to the south-west of Western Australia. It is a shrub with tufted, linear to lance-shaped leaves, and urn-shaped white to creamy-white and pink flowers arranged on short side shoots.

Description 
The leaves are arranged in tufts, linear to lance-shaped with the edges rolled under, so that the leaves appear cylindrical. The flowers are white to creamy-white and pink, arranged in clusters of 2 to 8 on short side shoots. The bracts are brown and shorter than the sepals lobes. There are no petals but the stamens have relatively large anthers. Flowering occurs from August to October.

Taxonomy
Cryptandra apetala was first formally described in 1909 by Alfred James Ewart and Jean White-Haney in the Proceedings of the Royal Society of Victoria from specimens collected near Cowcowing by Max Koch. The specific epithet (apetala) means "without petals".

In 1995, Barbara Lynette Rye described two varieties of C. apetala in the journal Nuytsia, and the names are accepted by the Australian Plant Census:
 Cryptandra apetala var. anomala Rye
 Cryptandra apetala Rye var. apetala

Distribution and habitat
This cryptandra grows on sandy soil in the Avon Wheatbelt, Coolgardie, Geraldton Sandplains, Mallee and Yalgoo bioregions of south-western Western Australia.

Conservation status
Both varieties of C. apetala are listed as "not threatened" by the Western Australian Government Department of Biodiversity, Conservation and Attractions.

References

apetala
Rosales of Australia
Flora of Western Australia
Plants described in 1909
Taxa named by Alfred James Ewart